László Nagy (13 August 1927 – 19 April 2005) was a Hungarian pair skater. Together with his sister Marianna Nagy he won five bronze medals at the Olympic Games (1952 and 1956) and world championships (1950, 1953, 1955), as well as two European titles (1950 and 1955).

In 1954 Nagy received his medical degree, and later for 30 years worked at a sports clinic in Budapest, being its chief physician in 1972–1987. He also served as a medical officer for Hungary’s national figure skating and football federations, and prepared several figure skaters, including Zsuzsa Almássy.

Competitive highlights
(with Marianna Nagy)

References

1927 births
2005 deaths
Figure skaters at the 1948 Winter Olympics
Figure skaters at the 1952 Winter Olympics
Figure skaters at the 1956 Winter Olympics
Olympic figure skaters of Hungary
Olympic bronze medalists for Hungary
Hungarian male pair skaters
Olympic medalists in figure skating
World Figure Skating Championships medalists
European Figure Skating Championships medalists
Medalists at the 1952 Winter Olympics
Medalists at the 1956 Winter Olympics
Sportspeople from Szombathely